"You're a Lady" is the debut single by British singer-songwriter Peter Skellern. Skellern's recording of the song was his first and biggest hit, reaching number three on the UK Singles Chart and number 50 on the U.S. Billboard Hot 100.
Skellern performed the song live on many occasions prior to his retirement in 2001. It became a constant feature of his double act with Richard Stilgoe, and renditions of the song feature on their albums  Who Plays Wins (1985) and A Quiet Night Out (2000).

Background
Skellern wrote "You're a Lady" in the summerhouse at his home in Shaftesbury, Dorset. He kept his piano there so as not to bother anyone with his practice. The song has been described as "a breathless love song". Skellern's vocals and piano accompaniment are supplemented by the Congregation, a choral pop ensemble who had already had their own top ten UK hit with "Softly Whispering I Love You", and by the Hanwell Band, heard unaccompanied in the introductory bars. Skellern once played with the National Youth Brass Band of Great Britain as a child, and he sought to recapture his "speechless amazement" at their sound by using the brass band on the record. The euphonium, played by John Luckett, is prominently featured. Skellern wanted the song to evoke the North of England, saying "I wanted people to see the wet cobblestones and the Lowry paintings when they heard 'You're a Lady'".

The single was placed on Radio Luxembourg on a pay-for-play basis, but was then picked up by Terry Wogan on his BBC Radio 2 programme. The single went on to sell over 800,000 copies and the song was also the first track on Skellern's 1972 album of the same name. The song's great success and the demands that came with it led Skellern to a six-month period, a couple of years later, where he "got drunk every day".

Charts

Cover versions
A French version of the song was released by folk singer Hugues Aufray with the title "Vous ma lady", and the following year the same version was released as a duet by Brigitte Bardot and Laurent Vergez.

Other performers who have covered the song include:
Johnny Mathis, on his 1973 album Me and Mrs. Jones
Dawn, on their 1973 album Tie A Yellow Ribbon
Telly Savalas, on his 1974 album Telly
Mocedades, on their 1981 album Desde que tú te has ido. Their version was translated into Spanish by Luis Gómez Escolar, and entitled Como siempre.
Peter Hofmann, on his 1987 album Rock Classics 2
Bart Peeters in 2019
Udo Lindenberg Bist 'ne Frau und ich ein Mann (You're a Lady) in 2008 from his album "Wenn du durchhängst" <ref>https://www.udo-lindenberg.de/bist_ne_frau_und_ich_ein_mann_you_re_a_lady.60403.htm

References

External links

 

1972 songs
1972 debut singles
Peter Skellern songs
Decca Records singles